Anto Daković (1823–1889) was the Grand Duke of Grahovo and a senator in the Prince-Bishopric of Montenegro.

Personal life 
His family hailed from the Kuči tribe. They come by origin from the Vujačić brotherhood and of taking the patronymic name of Dako Vujačić, the Grahovo Prince which was slain by Montenegrin tribesmen for his collaboration with the Ottomans. His father was Grahovo prince Jakov Daković, who chose in 1834 to annex the Grahovo region to Montenegro. Anto Daković had 2 sons, Perko (Pero) and Jakša (Jakov). According to Lazar Tomanović, Anto's last son, Perko, died in his youth on Easter of 1885, leaving one male kid in the cradle.

Education 
Anto finished primary school in the town Risan.

Military career 
In 1853, his father died. Omer Pasha besieged the cave (Demirovi) for 6 days near their tower by a military company. They were detained and brought to Mostar for fraud. His father died  near Klobuk during the night, and Anto and his colleagues were imprisoned until Montenegro made peace with Omer Pasha. Grahovo residents dug up his father and buried him near the Grahovo church. Prince Danilo awarded him with a prestigious Russian decoration for his performance in the wars of 1852–1853 against the army of Omer-pasha. In 1857, He was elected Grand Duke of Grahovo. He fought in the Battle of Grahovac in 1858, as well as in the insurgency.

References

Notes

Bibliography 

1823 births
1889 deaths